Volano is a comune (municipality) in Trentino in the northern Italian region Trentino-Alto Adige/Südtirol, located about  south of Trento.

Volano borders the following municipalities: Calliano, Pomarolo, Nomi and Rovereto.

Demographic evolution

References

Bibliography 
  (For the translation of the sculpture of the Blessed Virgin Mary with the Saint Archangels)

Cities and towns in Trentino-Alto Adige/Südtirol